Value in Health is a medical journal that covers original research and health policy articles in the field of health economics and outcomes research. The journal is published, on the behalf of ISPOR, by Elsevier.

Abstracting and indexing 
The journal is abstracted and indexed in:

 Current Contents - Social & Behavioral Sciences
 Embase
 PubMed/Medline
 International Pharmaceutical Abstracts
 Journal Citation Reports - Science Edition
 Social Sciences Citation Index
 PubMed/Medline

References

External links 

 

Elsevier academic journals
English-language journals
Publications with year of establishment missing
Healthcare journals